The 15283 / 84 Janaki Intercity Express is an Express train belonging to Indian Railways East Central Railway zone that runs between  and  in India.

History

Coaches
The 15283 / 84 Janaki Intercity Express has 13 general unreserved, 1 Sleeper class & two SLR (seating with luggage rake) coaches . It does not carry a pantry car coach.

As is customary with most train services in India, coach composition may be amended at the discretion of Indian Railways depending on demand.

Service

Stations

Traction
As the route is going to electrification, a Samastipur Loco Shed based WDM-3A diesel locomotive pulls the train to its destination.

References

External links
15283 Janaki Intercity Express at India Rail Info
15284 Janaki Intercity Express at India Rail Info

Intercity Express (Indian Railways) trains
Transport in Katihar
Rail transport in Bihar
Transport in Jainagar